Behind the Front is a 1926 American silent war comedy film directed by A. Edward Sutherland and starring Wallace Beery and Raymond Hatton. It was produced by Famous Players-Lasky and distributed by Paramount Pictures. The film was based on the novel The Spoils of War by Hugh Wiley.

Plot
As described in a film magazine review, two men, enemies in civil life, enlist in the army during World War I at the behest of a young woman who tells each of them that she loves him. They become buddies and share a medley of mishaps behind the lines in France. They return to America and go to the young woman’s house. There they find her the central figure in a wedding. They maul her husband-to-be and leave. A small incident recreates their enmity towards each other and their private war begins again.

Cast

Preservation
A print of Behind the Front is located in the George Eastman Museum Motion Picture Collection and UCLA Film and Television Archive.

See also
An excerpt from the film appears in the 1931 Paramount promotional film The House That Shadows Built
Gertrude Astor filmography

References

External links

Series of lobby posters

1926 films
American silent feature films
Films directed by A. Edward Sutherland
1920s war comedy films
American black-and-white films
American war comedy films
Surviving American silent films
1926 comedy films
1920s American films
Silent American comedy films
Silent war comedy films
1920s English-language films